Down the Road I Go is American country music artist Travis Tritt's seventh studio album. It was released on October 3, 2000, his first album for Columbia Records. The tracks "Best of Intentions", "It's a Great Day to Be Alive", "Love of a Woman",  and "Modern Day Bonnie and Clyde" were released as singles. "It's a Great Day to Be Alive" was originally recorded in 1996 by Jon Randall for an album which was never released. "Best of Intentions" was a Number One hit for him, and his first chart-topper since "Foolish Pride" in 1994. The album is certified Platinum for sales of over 1,000,000.

Critical reception
People wrote that "Tritt emerges sounding strangely like Kenny Rogers, right down to the hokey catch in the voice and the melodramatic story song, in this case an ill-advised tribute to a couple of sadistic thugs, 'Modern Day Bonnie and Clyde'."

Track listing

Personnel
 Mike Brignardello - bass guitar
 James Burton - electric guitar
 Larry Byrom - acoustic guitar
 Pat Coil - synthesizer
 John Cowan - background vocals
 Jerry Douglas - dobro
 Dan Dugmore - acoustic slide guitar, steel guitar
 Glen Duncan - fiddle
 Ray Flacke - electric guitar
 Aubrey Haynie - fiddle, mandolin
 Wes Hightower - background vocals
 Carl Jackson - banjo, background vocals
 John Barlow Jarvis - organ, piano
 Kirk "Jelly Roll" Johnson - harmonica
 Albert Lee - electric guitar
 Mac McAnally - acoustic guitar
 Dana McVicker - background vocals
 Brent Mason - electric guitar
 Greg Morrow - drums, percussion
 John Wesley Ryles - background vocals
 Travis Tritt - lead vocals, background vocals
 Billy Joe Walker Jr. - acoustic guitar, electric guitar, sitar, electric mandotar
 Glenn Worf - bass guitar
 Curtis Wright - background vocals

Charts

Weekly charts

Year-end charts

Certifications

References

2000 albums
Columbia Records albums
Travis Tritt albums
Albums produced by Billy Joe Walker Jr.